Mosvik is a former municipality in the old Nord-Trøndelag county in Norway. The municipality was part of the Innherred region. The  municipality existed from 1901 until its dissolution in 2012. The old municipality encompassed the southern part of what is now the municipality of Inderøy in Trøndelag county. The municipality was located along the western shore of the Trondheimsfjorden and on the southwestern end of the Beitstadfjorden.

The administrative centre of the municipality was the village of Mosvik where Mosvik Church is located. Other villages located near the village of Mosvik include Trongsundet, Framverran, Venneshamn, and Kjerringvik.

Until 1991, the connection from Mosvik municipality to the rest of the Innherred region was only available by a car ferry, at first via Ytterøya to Levanger, but later directly to Inderøy on the Vangshylla–Kjerringvik Ferry route. In 1991, the Skarnsund Bridge on Norwegian County Road 755 was completed, eliminating the need for a ferry.

The Skarnsund bridge was opened by King Harald V on 19 December 1991, after he had taken the last ferry across the fjord. A monument, the King's Stone, bearing the signature of the king, is located at the resting place on the Mosvik side.

History

The municipality of Mosvik was established on 1 January 1901 when the old municipality of Mosvik og Verran was divided into two new municipalities: Mosvik (population: 969) in the southeast and Verran (population: 1,456) in the north and west.

During the 1960s, there were many municipal changes across Norway due to the work of the Schei Committee. On 1 January 1968, the Framverran area on the south side of the Verrasundet strait (population: 395) was transferred from Verran municipality to Mosvik municipality.  On 1 January 2012, the municipality of Mosvik ceased to exist when it was merged into the neighboring municipality of Inderøy. Prior to the merger, Mosvik had 811 residents.

Name
The municipality was named Mosvik since the first Mosvik Church was built there. The first element is the genitive case of the river name  (now called the Mossa river). The name has historically been spelled Mosviken.

Coat of arms
The coat of arms was granted on 13 July 1984 and it was in use until 1 January 2012 when it became part of Inderøy Municipality. The official blazon is "Argent, two piles throughout reversed vert". This means the arms have a field (background) has a tincture of argent which means it is commonly colored white, but if it is made out of metal, then silver is used. The charge is a two green triangles pointing upwards. The design was chosen to symbolize the forests and trees in the municipality as well as to look like the letter M, the initial of the municipality. The arms were designed by Einar H. Skjervold. The municipal flag has the same design as the coat of arms.

Churches
The Church of Norway had one parish within the municipality of Mosvik. It was part of the Nord-Innherad prosti (deanery) in the Diocese of Nidaros.

Geography
The municipality was located south of the Skarnsund strait with the main Trondheimsfjord to the east and the Verrasundet strait to the west. The municipality of Leksvik was located to the south. The lake Meltingvatnet lies along the Leksvik border.

Government
While it existed, this municipality was responsible for primary education (through 10th grade), outpatient health services, senior citizen services, unemployment and other social services, zoning, economic development, and municipal roads. During its existence, this municipality was governed by a municipal council of elected representatives, which in turn elected a mayor.

Municipal council
The municipal council  of Mosvik was made up of representatives that were elected to four year terms. The party breakdown of the final municipal council was as follows:

Mayors
The mayors of Mosvik:

1901–1919: Einar Jenssen (H)
1920–1934: Ole H. Sæteraas (V)
1935–1941: Aksel Saltvik (LL)
1942–1945: Ola M. Hestebeit (NS)
1945-1945: Aksel Saltvik (Ap)
1946–1947: Elias Lorentsen (Ap)
1948–1955: Tomas Tangstad (V)
1956–1969: Trygve Aaring (LL)
1970–1979: Peter Å. Gipling (Sp)
1980–1986: Jarle Aune (Sp)
1987-1987: Asbjørn Wibe (LL)
1988-1993: Arne Aasan (Ap)
1994–2003: Per Vennes (Sp)
2003–2011: Carl Ivar von Køppen (Sp)

Notable people 
 Gunnar Viken  (born 1948) former County mayor, raised on a family farm in Mosvik
 Petter Northug (born 1986 in Framverran) a Norwegian former cross-country skier and double Olympic champion
 Tomas Northug (born 1990 in Mosvik) a Norwegian cross-country skier
 Even Northug (born 1995) a Norwegian cross-country skier

See also
List of former municipalities of Norway

References

External links

 
Inderøy
Former municipalities of Norway
1901 establishments in Norway
2012 disestablishments in Norway